Group B of the 2004 Fed Cup Americas Zone Group II was one of two pools in the Americas Zone Group II of the 2004 Fed Cup. Four teams competed in a round robin competition, with the top two teams and the bottom two teams proceeding to their respective sections of the play-offs: the top teams play for advancement to the Group I.

Bolivia vs. Venezuela

Bolivia vs. Dominican Republic

Venezuela vs. Dominican Republic

See also
Fed Cup structure

References

External links
 Fed Cup website

2004 Fed Cup Americas Zone